Sam Houston High School may refer to a high school in the United States, named after Sam Houston:

Sam Houston High School (Arlington, Texas)
Sam Houston High School (Houston), now known as Sam Houston Math, Science, and Technology Center
Sam Houston High School (Louisiana)
Sam Houston High School (San Antonio, Texas)